Jayammu Nischayammu Raa is 1989 Indian Telugu-language comedy film produced by G. V. H. Prasad under the Sudarshana Pictures banner, presented by Satyanarayana and Kota Srinivasa Rao and directed by Jandhyala. It stars Rajendra Prasad, Sumalatha and Chandra Mohan, with music composed by Raj–Koti. The film's title is a famous song from the Telugu film Sabhash Ramudu (1959). The film marked the debut of famous comedian Dharmavarapu Subramanyam in the film industry. The film was recorded as a Super Hit at the box office. The film was remade in Tamil as Killadi Mappillai (1994).

Plot
The film begins with two friends, Rambabu (Rajendra Prasad) and Suribabu (Chandra Mohan). They live as tenants in the house of Gopalam (Brahmanandam), a hound of playing instruments and his wife Kantham (Srilakshmi) pesters by hugging everyone who remembers their deceased son Chitti. Once Rambabu gets acquainted with a beautiful girl Shanti (Sumalatha) and falls for her. Simultaneously, Suribabu loves a girl Seeta (Avanthi) one that suffers from family dysfunction. Suribabu works to tackles which is a never-ending process. After completion of the studies, Shanti returns to her village. Rambabu & Suribabu fail to detect her and return to their hometowns. Here, Suribabu notices Shanti as his neighbor and informs Rambabu. Besides, Rambabu's father Ranganatham (Dharmavarapu Subramanyam) fixes his alliance with his best friend Jaganatham's (Suthi Velu) daughter i.e. Shanti only. Being incognizant of it, Rambabu refuses the match and challenges his father to succeed in his love within 6 months. At present, Rambabu lands at Suribabu's village proposes Shanti which she denies as she loathes the love and affirms to make an arranged marriage.

So, Rambabu decides to inspire her parents when he learns Jaganatham is a martinet atheist and his wife Subbalakshmi (Radha Kumari) is an adherent devotee. Rambabu engraves them in both ways. Soon after, he discovers Jaganatham's assumption that he must like his parents too. Thus, Rambabu concocts Gopalam & Kantham as his parents and gets in. Thereupon, Rambabu confronts Shanti to couple up her with elders' acceptance. Accordingly, she aims to bring out his reality. After a few comic incidents, a clash arises between Jaganatham & Ranganatham and they call off the match. Now Jaganatham decides to perform Shanti's espousal with Rambabu. Before, he conducts a few tests to him with the help of a guy Chakrapani (Ashok Kumar). Along, Shanti understands the virtue of Rambabu. As a closing, Jaganatham announces Shanti's nuptials with Chakrapani for which Rambabu blissfully agrees. Exploiting it, Chakrapani's swindler father Narayana (Satyanarayana) prints the wedding cards. During that plight, Rambabu makes a play and teaches a lesson to Narayana. Eventually, Jaganatham realizes Rambabu is Ranganatham's son and they reunite. Finally, the movie ends on a happy note with the marriage of Rambabu & Shanti.

Cast

 Rajendra Prasad as Rambabu
 Sumalatha as Shanthi
 Chandra Mohan as Suribabu
 Satyanarayana as Narayana
 Kota Srinivasa Rao as Patil
 Brahmanandam as Gopalam
 Suthi Velu as Jaganatham
 Dharmavarapu Subramanyam as Ranganatham
 Ashok Kumar as Chakrapani
 Telephone Satyanarayana as Murthy
 Satti Babu as Gruhaspathi
 Srilakshmi as Kantham
 Avanthi as Seetha
 Radha Kumari as Subbalakshmi

Special appearances
 Krishna as himself
 Venkatesh as himself
 Suman as himself
 Ramesh Babu as himself

Soundtrack

Music composed by Raj–Koti. Music released on AMC Audio Company.

Other
 VCDs and DVDs on - Sri Ganesh Video Company, Bangalore

References

External links

Indian comedy films
Films directed by Jandhyala
Films scored by Raj–Koti
1980s Telugu-language films
Telugu films remade in other languages